"Dedicated Follower of Fashion" is a 1966 song by British band the Kinks. It lampoons the contemporary British fashion scene and mod culture in general. Originally released as a single, it has been included on many of the band's later albums.

Musically, it and "A Well Respected Man" marked the beginning of an expansion in the Kinks' inspirations, drawing as much from British music hall traditions as from American rhythm and blues, the inspiration for breakthrough Kinks songs like "You Really Got Me". While it was quite scornful toward them, many of the fashionistas the song mocks would later take its title to heart.

Background

In the mid-1960s fashion in Britain was becoming increasingly daring and outrageous, driven by the youth-oriented culture of Swinging London. Boutiques such as Biba, designers like Mary Quant, and the television personalities like Cathy McGowan who popularised them became celebrated as much as the entertainers who wore their mod clothes.

Fashion trends changed rapidly, and the Carnaby Street shops did a brisk business from those trying to avoid seeming out of step with the latest craze. Ray Davies saw all this and satirised the hypothetical extreme, a superficial dandy whose "clothes are loud but never square / It will make or break him so he's got to buy the best ... He thinks he is a flower to be looked at ... In matters of the cloth he is as fickle as can be."

Inspiration
Ray Davies claimed that the song was inspired by a fight he had with a fashion designer at a party:

Davies claims he wrote the song in one sitting, typing the lyrics out on a typewriter, with no later revision.  It was performed with Davies mostly accompanying himself on acoustic guitar, with the rest of the band joining in on the "It will make or break him so he's got to buy the best 'cause..." and echoing the "Oh yes he is" lines in the refrain. The song contains two lines from the 1905 English adventure novel The Scarlet Pimpernel; "they seek him here, they seek him there".

The band attempted recording the song a number of times, playing with the arrangement, lyric diction, and guitar sounds.  Davies was never totally satisfied with the released version, and was angered that the song's production and release were rushed by the band's managers and Pye Records. Specifically, he attempted the opening multiple times. Pete Quaife said of these attempts:

At least two of the alternative versions are available as bonus CD tracks and as bootleg recordings.

Reception

The British record-buying public enjoyed the jab at "the whole Carnabetian army" enough to put the song into the top five, reaching number four on the UK Singles Chart. It became their first top five single since "Tired of Waiting for You", which reached number one in early 1965.  It reached the top of the charts in The Netherlands and New Zealand. In the US, however, it barely managed to crack the Top Forty, peaking at #36.  The lyrics won Davies an Ivor Novello Award for songwriting in 1966.

Despite the praise for the song, Kinks guitarist Dave Davies described the song as "terrible", saying, "[it was] the one Kink record I haven't got."

Billboard said the song had a "clever, music-hall melody and lyric in the bag of [the Kinks] smash 'A Well Respected Man.'"

Legacy

Despite its commercial success, the song actually began to trigger some of the identity crises that would later plague Davies' personal life. He wrote later:

In subsequent years many of those the song derided would later take its title to heart. Holly Brubach, fashion writer for The New Yorker, borrowed the song's title for a collection of her essays. Outside of fashion, the song's title has remained a metaphor for slavish conformity, but in a more positive sense as an analogy for the growth of online social networks.

In 1993, the song was included in the soundtrack of the Jim Sheridan film In the Name of the Father.

Personnel 
According to band researcher Doug Hinman, except where noted:

The Kinks
Ray Davies lead vocal, acoustic twelve-string guitar
Dave Davies backing vocal, electric guitar
Pete Quaife bass
Mick Avory drums

Additional musician
Nicky Hopkins piano

Charts

References

Sources

External links
The Official Ray Davies Web Site

The Kinks songs
1966 singles
Dutch Top 40 number-one singles
Number-one singles in New Zealand
Satirical songs
Song recordings produced by Shel Talmy
Songs about London
Songs written by Ray Davies
Pye Records singles
Reprise Records singles
1966 songs